Music For The Maases is an electronic compilation album mixed by German DJ Timo Maas in 2000. It was released on October 3, 2000.

Track listing
Disc 1
 Azzido Da Bass - Dooms Night (Timo Maas Mix) (6:14)
 Muse - Sunburn (Timo Maas Breakz Again Mix) (4:06)
 Mad Dogs - Better Make Room (Original Mix) (7:30)	
 Jan Driver - Drive By (Timo Maas Mix) (6:54)
 Timo Maas feat. Digital City - City Borealis (8:29)
 Kinetic A.T.O.M. - Atom Noize (5:48)
 Timo Maas - Riding on a Storm (4:53) 
 Timo Maas - Eclipse (6:55)
 Timo Maas - Der Schieber (6:17)
 Green Velvet - Flash (Timo Maas Mix) (5:34)

Disc 2
 Paganini Traxx - Zoë (Timo Maas Mix) (7:08)
 Ian  Wilkie vs. Timo Maas - Twin Town (Original Mix) (7:15)
 Big Ron - Let The Freak (Timo Maas Mix) (6:17)
 Timo Maas - Schieber 1 (5:34)
 Major North - Annihilate (Timo Maas Mix) (7:30)
 Lustral feat. Tracy Akerman - Everytime (Unreleased Vocal Timo Maas Mix) (8:36)
 [O] - Fifteenth Letter Of The Alphabet (Club Mix) (6:10)
 Poseidon - Supertransonic (Timo Maas Mix) (7:45)
 Orinoko - Mama Konda (Timo Maas Mix) (6:17)
 Orinoko - Mama Konda (High On Kilimanjaro Mix) (9:39)

Timo Maas albums
2000 compilation albums